Tony Jackson (born July 5, 1982) is a former American football fullback. He was drafted by the Seattle Seahawks in the sixth round of the 2005 NFL Draft. He played college football at Iowa.

Early years
Jackson attended Willow Run High School in Ypsilanti, Michigan, where he starred in football, basketball, and track & field. In football, he was a two-time All-Conference pick.

Professional career

Seattle Seahawks
Jackson was drafted by the Seattle Seahawks as a tight end in the sixth round (196th overall) of the 2005 NFL Draft. However, he was waived by the team following the preseason.

New York Giants
Jackson was signed by the New York Giants in the 2006 offseason, but failed to make the team out of training camp and was released.

Oakland Raiders
Jackson was signed to the practice squad of the Oakland Raiders on October 25, 2006. He was re-signed by the team in the 2007 offseason, but waived on July 24. He again spent time with the team during the 2008 offseason, but was released on July 18.

External links
 Iowa profile

1982 births
Living people
American football fullbacks
American football tight ends
Iowa Hawkeyes football players
New York Giants players
Oakland Raiders players
Seattle Seahawks players
Sportspeople from Ypsilanti, Michigan
Players of American football from Michigan